Cinto Euganeo is a comune (municipality) in the Province of Padua in the Italian region Veneto, located about  southwest of Venice and about  southwest of Padua.

Cinto Euganeo borders the following municipalities: Baone, Galzignano Terme, Lozzo Atestino, Vo.

Demographic evolution

References

Cities and towns in Veneto